John Bellamy Foster (born August 15, 1953) is an American professor of sociology at the University of Oregon and editor of the Monthly Review. He writes about political economy of capitalism and economic crisis, ecology and ecological crisis, and Marxist theory. He has given numerous interviews, talks, and invited lectures, as well as written invited commentary, articles, and books on the subject.

Early life 
Foster was active in the anti-war and environmental movements before enrolling at Evergreen State College in 1971. He studied economics in response to what he saw as an unfolding crisis in the capitalist economy and US involvement with the 1973 Chilean coup d'état.

In 1976, he moved to Canada and entered the political science graduate program at York University in Toronto. He submitted his 1979 paper, The United States and Monopoly Capital: The Issue of Excess Capacity, to Paul Sweezy of Monthly Review. He also was published in journals such as The Quarterly Journal of Economics and Science & Society, and, in 1986, published The Theory of Monopoly Capitalism: An Elaboration of Marxian Political Economy, based on his Ph.D. dissertation.

Foster was hired in 1985 as a Visiting Member of the Faculty at The Evergreen State College. One year later he took a position as assistant professor of sociology at the University of Oregon, and became a full professor of sociology in 2000. In 1989 he became a director of the Monthly Review Foundation Board and a member of the editorial committee of Monthly Review.

Monthly Review

Foster published his first article for Monthly Review, "Is Monopoly Capital an Illusion?", while in graduate school in 1981. He became a director of the Monthly Review Foundation Board and a member of the Monthly Review editorial committee in 1989. Along with Robert McChesney, who had since their days at Evergreen College become a leading scholar of the political economy of the media, Foster joined Paul Sweezy and Harry Magdoff as a co-editor of Monthly Review in 2000. Two years later, he became president of the Monthly Review Foundation.

After Paul Sweezy's death in 2004, Robert McChesney's resignation as co-editor (while remaining on the board), and Harry Magdoff's death in 2006, Foster was left as sole editor of the magazine.

Work 
Foster's initial research centered on Marxian political economies and theories of capitalist development, with a focus on Paul Sweezy and Paul Baran's theory of monopoly. This was reflected in Foster's early book The Theory of Monopoly Capitalism and the coedited volume (with Henryk Szlajfer), The Faltering Economy: The Problem of Accumulation under Monopoly Capitalism.

In the late 1980s, Foster turned toward issues of ecology. He focused on the relationship between the global environmental crisis and the crisis in the capitalist economy, while stressing the imperative for a sustainable, socialist alternative. During this period he published The Vulnerable Planet: A Short Economic History of the Environment; his article "Marx's Theory of Metabolic Rift" in the American Journal of Sociology; and Marx's Ecology: Materialism and Nature. His reinterpretation of Marx on ecology introduced the concept of "metabolic rift" and was widely influential. This work led to his receiving the Distinguished Contribution Award of the American Sociological Association's Environment and Technology section. Marx's Ecology itself received the book award from the ASA's Section on Marxist Sociology. This work was soon followed up by his book Ecology Against Capitalism, which focused on the critique of capitalist economics from the standpoint of the environment.

As editor of Monthly Review, Foster returned to his earlier work on the political economy of capitalism, but with a renewed focus on the role of U.S. foreign policy following September 2001. His 2006 book Naked Imperialism, along with frequent editorials in the pages of Monthly Review, attempted to account for the growing U.S. military role in the world and the shift toward a more visible, aggressive global projection. Additionally, Foster has worked to expand Sweezy and Baran’s theory of monopoly capital in light of the current financially led phase of capitalism, which he terms "monopoly-finance Capital." In this context he has written several books on the financialization of capitalism and financial crisis of 2007–08.

Critique of Intelligent Design, Foster’s book co-authored with Brett Clark and Richard York, is a continuation of his research on materialist philosophy and the relationship between ancient Greek philosopher Epicurus and Karl Marx. Drawing on his ecological work, particularly Marx’s Ecology, Foster defends historical materialism as fundamental to a rational, scientific worldview, against proponents of Intelligent Design and other non-materialist ideologies.

Foster's book The Return of Nature: Socialism and Ecology (2020) won the Deutscher Memorial Prize for that year. In the book, 'Foster explores how socialist analysts and materialist scientists of various stamps, first in Britain, then the United States, from William Morris and Friedrich Engels to Joseph Needham, Rachel Carson, and Stephen Jay Gould, sought to develop a dialectical naturalism, rooted in a critique of capitalism.'

Bibliography
 The Vulnerable Planet (1999)
 Marx's Ecology (2000)
 Ecology Against Capitalism (2002)
 The Ecological Revolution (2009)
 The Theory of Monopoly Capitalism (2014)
 Foster, J.B., B. Clark, and R. York (2010) The Ecological Rift
 Foster, J.B. and R.W. McChesney (2012) The Endless Crisis
 Foster, J.B. and P. Burkett (2016) Marx and the Earth 
 Trump in the White House: Tragedy and Farce (2017)
The Return of Nature: Socialism and Ecology (2020)
Capitalism in the Anthropocene: Ecological Ruin or Ecological Revolution (2022)

Articles, lectures, and interviews
 1999. Marx's theory of metabolic rift: classical foundations for environmental sociology. American Journal of Sociology 105(2):366-405. DOI: 10.1086/210315
 2016. Marxism in the Anthropocene: dialectical rifts on the Left. International Critical Thought 6(3):393-421. DOI: 10.1080/21598282.2016.1197787

See also
 Eco-socialism
 Environmental sociology
 Metabolic rift
 Social metabolism

References

External links

 John Bellamy Foster's personal website

Further reading
 

1953 births
Living people
American economics writers
American male essayists
American essayists
American magazine editors
American Marxists
American political writers
American socialists
American sociologists
Ecosocialists
Environmental sociologists
Marxist theorists
American Marxist writers
Deutscher Memorial Prize winners
Anti-consumerists
University of Oregon faculty
American non-fiction environmental writers
Evergreen State College faculty
Evergreen State College alumni
York University alumni
Educators from Seattle
Writers from Seattle
Imperialism studies